Robert Bruce Abrams (born November 18, 1960) is a retired four-star general in the United States Army who last served as the commander of United States Forces Korea. He concurrently served as the commander of United Nations Command and commander of R.O.K.-U.S. Combined Forces Command. He previously served as the 22nd commanding general of United States Army Forces Command from August 10, 2015 to October 17, 2018. He is a 1982 graduate of the United States Military Academy where he was commissioned as an armor officer. During his years of active service, he has held command and staff positions across the Army and joint community in Germany, the United States, Southwest Asia and South Korea. Abrams comes from a family of career military officers. His father was former Army Chief of Staff General Creighton W. Abrams Jr., and both of his elder brothers, Creighton and John, were Army general officers.

He relinquished command of United States Command, Combined Forces Command and United States Forces Korea to General Paul LaCamera on July 2, 2021 and retired soon after.

Assignments

Abrams' tours of duty with war-fighting units include the 3rd Armored Division as a lieutenant; the 1st Cavalry Division as a captain, and as a major in the 3rd Armored Cavalry Regiment, as a lieutenant colonel (including battalion command and as the Division G3) and colonel (including command of a brigade combat team and as the division chief of staff). His joint experience includes serving as a Strategic War Planner for the Chairman of the Joint Chiefs of Staff with responsibility for the United States Central Command's Area of Operations; and as the Director of the Joint Center of Excellence for IED Defeat, a subordinate of the Joint Improvised-Threat Defeat Agency (JIDA).

Commands
Abrams has commanded at every level from company through divisional command. His first command was of D Company and Headquarters and Headquarters Company, 1st Battalion, 8th Cavalry Regiment. He deployed the company in support of Operations Desert Shield and Desert Storm. Abrams's next command assignment was at battalion level, with 1st Battalion, 8th Cavalry Regiment, 1st Cavalry Division.

Later, Abrams served as the commander of the 1st Brigade Combat Team (Iron Horse), 1st Cavalry Division, where he deployed to East Baghdad, Iraq in support of Operation Iraqi Freedom II, as commanding general of Fort Irwin & the National Training Center, and most recently as commanding general of the 3rd Infantry Division at Fort Stewart, Georgia from 2011 to 2013, during which he served as commander of Regional Command South in Kandahar, Afghanistan.

Abrams has extensive operational experience, having served as an operations officer at squadron, regimental and divisional level. Abrams has also served as an instructor, written doctrine and developed training at the United States Army Armor School, and as executive officer to the Commanding General United States Army Europe and Seventh Army.

Abrams's general officer assignments also include service as the Deputy Commanding General, Combined Arms Center-Training, Fort Leavenworth, Kansas and the commander of the National Training Center at Fort Irwin, California.

In 2015, Abrams was assigned as Commanding General, United States Army Forces Command, which oversees all United States Army combat units in the continental United States.

On October 11, 2018, the Senate confirmed his nomination to command United States Forces Korea. Abrams relinquished command of Army Forces Command to his deputy commander, Lieutenant General Laura Richardson, on October 16, and assumed command of United States Forces Korea from General Vincent K. Brooks on November 7.

In 2020, Abrams was among the candidates shortlisted to replace Admiral Philip S. Davidson as the commander of United States Indo-Pacific Command, but Admiral John C. Aquilino was nominated instead.

In May 2021, Abrams was bestowed the Korean name Woo Byung-soo by the ROK-US Alliance Friendship Association in honor of "his contributions to the alliance and defense of South Korea".

His retirement ceremony was held on August 31, 2021.

Education

Abrams holds a Bachelor of Science degree from the United States Military Academy, a Master of Science in Administration from Central Michigan University, and a master's degree in Strategic Studies from the United States Army War College.

His military schooling includes the Armor Basic [Cavalry] and Advanced Courses, Basic Airborne Course, Ranger School [Class 5–83], the Combined Arms and Services Staff School, the U.S. Army Command and General Staff College, and the Army War College.

Awards and decorations
Medals and awards earned by Abrams include:

Notes

References

External links
 

1960 births
Living people
United States Army personnel of the Iraq War
United States Army personnel of the Gulf War
Recipients of the Legion of Merit
Central Michigan University alumni
United States Army War College alumni
United States Army generals
United States Military Academy alumni
Commanders, United States Forces Korea